Taylor County may refer to the following counties in the United States:

Taylor County, Florida
Taylor County, Georgia
Taylor County, Iowa
Taylor County, Kentucky
Taylor County, Texas
Taylor County, West Virginia
Taylor County, Wisconsin